Pakistan competed at the 1998 Commonwealth Games in Kuala Lumpur, Malaysia, between 11 and 21 September 1998.

Medallists

Athletics

Men
Track and road events

Field events

Badminton

 Wajid Ali
 Ali Yar Beg

Cricket 

Squad
 Arshad Khan (c)
 Akhtar Sarfraz
 Asif Mahmood
 Azhar Shafiq
 Javed Qadeer (wk)
 Kashif Ahmed
 Mohammad Hussain
 Mohammad Javed
 Saleem Elahi
 Shahid Nazir
 Shoaib Akhtar
 Suleman Huda
 Taimur Khan
 Wajahatullah Wasti

Results

Squash 

 Islam Khan Shams
 Khasif Shuja
 Mansoor Zaman
 Zarak Jahan Khan

Weightlifting 

 Kamran Majid

See also 
 Pakistan at the Commonwealth Games

References 

1998
1998 in Pakistani sport
Nations at the 1998 Commonwealth Games